Joy is an unincorporated community in Livingston County, Kentucky, United States. It was known as the Lawless Blacksmith Shop.

History
The area is known for its post office, named Joy, that was established in 1896, and remained in operation until 1957. The name "Joy" was most likely selected for its brevity.

The Mantle Rock Archeological District, which is associated with the Cherokee Trail of Tears, is nearby and is listed on the National Register of Historic Places.

References

Unincorporated communities in Livingston County, Kentucky
Unincorporated communities in Kentucky
Blacksmith shops